Michael Newell (born 25 February 1965 in Blackburn, Lancashire, England) is the current Director of Cricket of Nottinghamshire County Cricket Club and a retired English cricketer.

References

External links
{https://cricketarchive.com/Archive/Players/4/4566/4566.html}

1965 births
Living people
English cricketers
English cricket coaches
Nottinghamshire cricketers
Nottinghamshire cricket coaches
Cricketers from Blackburn
People educated at West Bridgford School